Ivan Ćurić (born 18 May 1987 in Split) is a Croatian football forward who currently plays for NK Solin in the Treća HNL.

Club career
A product of Hajduk Split academy, Ćurić started his senior career with several third level clubs, before his scoring form with Primorac 1929 netted him a transfer to the Druga HNL side Mosor. He excelled there in the first part of the 2011–12 season, scoring 12 goals in 12 matches, which made him the top scorer of the league at the winter break, along with Alen Guć and Martin Šaban. His form drew foreign attention and he moved to the Ekstraklasa side Podbeskidzie Bielsko-Biała in January 2012, on a one and a half year deal. He made his league debut on 18 February 2012 against Widzew Łódź (1–0).

References

External links
 
 

1987 births
Living people
Footballers from Split, Croatia
Association football forwards
Croatian footballers
Croatia youth international footballers
NK Uskok players
HNK Zmaj Makarska players
NK Primorac 1929 players
NK Mosor players
Podbeskidzie Bielsko-Biała players
NK Imotski players
NK Solin players
First Football League (Croatia) players
Ekstraklasa players
Second Football League (Croatia) players
Croatian expatriate footballers
Expatriate footballers in Poland
Croatian expatriate sportspeople in Poland